Sandal Rugby Union Football Club is an English rugby union team based in Sandal Magna near Wakefield, West Yorkshire. The club runs three senior sides, a veterans team, academy and colts teams and ten junior teams. The first XV plays in North Premier.

History
Sandal RUFC was formed in 1927 by former Wakefield RFC player Claude Beaumont.

Honours
 North Division 1 champions: 1994-95
Yorkshire Cup winners (3): 1997, 2001, 2019
Yorkshire 1 champions: 2007-08
North 1 (east v west) promotion play-off winners: 2009–10
National League 3 (north v midlands) promotion play-off winners: 2014–15

Notable former players
Eric Batten
Charles Chester
Jimmy Ledgard
Donald Metcalfe
Roger Pearman
Neal Spencer
Peter Read - England RU international

References

External links
Sandal RUFC website

English rugby union teams
Rugby clubs established in 1927
Sport in Wakefield